Universal Harvester is a novel by the American novelist and singer-songwriter John Darnielle. It is the second novel written by Darnielle, after Wolf in White Van. It tells the story of a video store clerk in Iowa who finds strange and disturbing clips recorded over the store's VHS tapes.

The New York Times Book Review described the novel as "effortlessly sketching modest lives in the green, empty expanses of the heartland" and noted "ultimately the novel doesn't belong in the horror aisle".

Universal Harvester was released on February 7, 2017.

References

External links
 Universal Harvester on the Macmillan website

2017 American novels
Farrar, Straus and Giroux books
American horror novels
Books with cover art by Rodrigo Corral
Novels set in Iowa